Roger R. Keller was a professor of religion at Brigham Young University (BYU). He retired in the summer of 2012.

Keller is a convert to the Church of Jesus Christ of Latter-day Saints (LDS Church) having been at times both a Presbyterian and a Methodist minister prior to joining the LDS Church.

Keller earned a Ph.D. in religion from Duke University in 1975.  Keller served as a Russian linguist for U.S. military intelligence.  Besides being a Presbyterian minister, he was also a chaplain at a Presbyterian College.

Keller was one of the co-editors with Spencer J. Palmer of The Gospel and World Religions.  He also wrote Book of Mormon Authors: Their Words and Messages, and Light & Truth: A Latter-day Saint Guide to World Religions, his newest book, published in 2012.

Keller has served as a bishop in the LDS Church.

Keller has in the past been among the holders of BYU's Richard L. Evans Chair of Religious Understanding.  Keller has a long tradition of promoting religious understanding and inter-faith good will; back when he was a Protestant pastor he was among those who spoke out against The God Makers.

Keller was also the director of BYU's program for the training of military chaplains.

Notes

Sources
BYU bio

American leaders of the Church of Jesus Christ of Latter-day Saints
Converts to Mormonism from Methodism
American chaplains
Brigham Young University faculty
Duke Divinity School alumni
Living people
Converts to Mormonism from Presbyterianism
Latter Day Saints from Utah
Latter Day Saints from North Carolina
Year of birth missing (living people)